Blind may refer to:
 The state of blindness, being unable to see 
 A window blind, a covering for a window

Blind may also refer to:

Arts, entertainment, and media

Films 
 Blind (2007 film), a Dutch drama by Tamar van den Dop
 Blind (2011 film), a South Korean crime thriller
 Blind (2014 film), a Norwegian drama
 Blind (2016 film), an American drama
 Blind (2019 film), an American horror film
 Blind (upcoming film), an upcoming Indian crime thriller, based on 2011 South Korean film of the same name

Music
 Blind (band), Australian Christian rock group founded in 1999
 Blind (rapper), Italian rapper

Albums
 Blind (Corrosion of Conformity album), 1991
 Blind (The Icicle Works album), 1988
 Blind (The Sundays album), 1992
 Blind!, a 1985 album by the Sex Gang Children

Songs
 "Blind" (Breed 77 song), 2006
 "Blind" (Feder song), 2015
 "Blind" (Hercules and Love Affair song), 2008
 "Blind" (Hurts song), 2013
 "Blind" (Korn song), 1994
 "Blind" (Lifehouse song), 2005
 "Blind" (SZA song), 2022
 "Blind" (Talking Heads song), 1988
 "Blind", a song by Band of Susans from Veil, 1993
 "Blind", a song by Company Flow
 "Blind", a song by Deep Purple from their 1969 album Deep Purple
 "Blind", a song by Gomez from their album Split the Difference
 "Blind", a song by Jars of Clay from their 1995 album Jars of Clay
 "Blind", a song by Jason Derulo from Jason Derulo
 "Blind", a classical art song by John Ireland (1879–1962)
 "Blind", a song by Kesha from the album Animal
 "Blind", a song by Mary Mary from their album, Something Big
 "Blind", a song by Placebo from their fifth album Meds
 "Blind", a song by PrettyMuch
 "Blind", a song by the Planet Smashers
 "Blind", a song by Swans from the album White Light from the Mouth of Infinity
 "Blind", a song by TV on the Radio from their 2003 EP Young Liars

Other uses in arts, entertainment, and media
 The Blind (Les Aveugles), a play written in 1890 by the Belgian playwright Maurice Maeterlinck
 The Blind (Gibran play)
 Blind (Australian TV series), a 2019 Australian web series
 Blind (South Korean TV series), a 2022 South Korean television series
 Blind (cards), a hand of cards dealt face down that a player may subsequently exchange with
 Blind (poker), a blind bet used for betting in some forms of poker
 'Bl/ind', a company from My Chemical Romance's 4th studio album Danger Days: The True Lives of the Fabulous Killjoys

Electronics, engineering, and science
 Blind (app), a chat app
 Blind, a digital signal processing term that indicates ignorance of certain parameters central to a process; e.g., blind deconvolution
 Blind experiment (single-blind or double-blind), a procedure to reduce bias in scientific experiments
 Blind hole, a mechanical engineering term for a hole that does not come out at the other side
 Blind via (electronics), an electrical term used in printed circuit board
 Blinding (cryptography)

Other uses
 Bird blind, also called a "bird hide", used to conceal the observer when watching or photographing birds or other animals
 Hunting blind, used to conceal the observer when watching or hunting birds or other animals
 Blind (munition), a piece of unexploded ordnance that failed to go off when fired
 Blind Skateboards, a skateboard company
 Blind-baking, the process of baking a pie crust or other pastry without the filling
 Blind (surname), list of notable people with the name

See also 
 Blind River (disambiguation)
 Blinded (disambiguation)
 Blinds (disambiguation)